Maya Choudhury (born 3 March) is an Indian actress who appears in Manipuri films. Some of her famous films are Basantagee Nongallamdai trilogy, Momon Meenok, 21st Century's Kunti, Nungshibee Takhellei and Tomthin Shija. In 2019 movie Pandam Amada, she was cast as the main protagonist's mother. The film was selected for 18th International Dhaka Film Festival 2019, 18th Third Eye Asian Film Festival 2019, Mumbai and Tokyo Lift-Off Film Festival 2020.

Career
Maya Choudhury first appeared on screen in the celluloid film Aroiba Bidaai (1999). She won the Miss Manipur 2nd runners up Title along with five subtitles in 1998. Before she got married, she did three films, Aroiba Bidaai (1999), Meichak (2000) & Piranglakta Manglan Ama (lately released in 2011). After marriage, she is supported by her husband and family to continue acting. Her role as Sarla in the 2006 film Basantagee Nongallamdai garnered positive response from the audience. With her husband Manikanta as producer, she had also directed a movie titled Mang-Ngal.

Some popular films of her include Basantagee Nongallamdai, Ujaningba Saktam, Achumba Paokhum, Liklaai, Imphal Ningol, 21st Century's Kunti, Saklon Amada and Momon Meenok. In the film Meiree Natte Liklani, Choudhury played an antagonistic role. Around 2012, she took a gap from acting.

Her comeback in the industry is marked with films like Leikhamton, Imoinu, Shajik Thaba, Tomthin Shija  and Hiyai.

Selected filmography

References

External links
 
 

Living people
Meitei people
People from Imphal
Indian film actresses
Actresses from Manipur
Actresses in Meitei cinema
21st-century Indian actresses
Year of birth missing (living people)